Mons Esam is a small, isolated mountain in the northern part of the Mare Tranquillitatis. It is located to the southeast of the crater Vitruvius and to the west-northwest of Lyell. To the northeast of this ridge is the bay called Sinus Amoris.

The selenographic coordinate of this feature is 14.6° N, 35.7° E, and it has a maximum diameter at the base of 8 km. The name of this feature is an Arabic masculine name, and it was not chosen to represent a specific individual. This peak is a lunar cone that was formed through tectonic processes, which rises roughly 400 meters above the surrounding plains.

A pair of tiny craters just to the south of Mons Esam have been assigned names by the IAU. These are listed in the table below.  The craters are at the tops of two lunar domes, which are most likely volcanoes and were not formed by impacts.

References

 
 
 
 
 
 
 
 
 
 
 
 

Esam, Mons